Roman Lazúr (born 23 November 1977 in Vranov nad Topľou) is a Slovak football midfielder who currently plays for club MFK Vranov nad Topľou.

He previously played for clubs including Prešov.

References

1977 births
Living people
Association football midfielders
Slovak footballers
MFK Vranov nad Topľou players
1. FC Tatran Prešov players
FC VSS Košice players
FC Steel Trans Ličartovce players
ŠK Futura Humenné players
MFK Zemplín Michalovce players
MŠK Rimavská Sobota players
Slovak Super Liga players
Expatriate footballers in Thailand
People from Vranov nad Topľou
Sportspeople from the Prešov Region